East Sister is the highest independent mountain located completely within Lyon County in Nevada, United States. It is located within the Sweetwater Mountains just a short distance north of the highest point in Lyon County on the northeast ridge of Middle Sister. The peak is within the Humboldt-Toiyabe National Forest.

References 

Mountains of Nevada
Landforms of Lyon County, Nevada
Humboldt–Toiyabe National Forest